Dave Clarke (born February 14, 1950) was a Canadian football player who played for the Hamilton Tiger-Cats. He won the Grey Cup with Hamilton in 1972. He played college football at the University of Guelph.

References

1950 births
Living people
Hamilton Tiger-Cats players
Canadian football defensive backs
Guelph Gryphons football players